The Puzhehei Bridge is a cable-stayed bridge under construction in Yunnan, China. The bridge will carry the new Luqiuguangfu Expressway across the valley of the Nanpan River.

See also
List of tallest bridges
List of highest bridges
List of longest cable-stayed bridge spans

References

External links
http://www.highestbridges.com/wiki/index.php?title=Nanpanjiang_Bridge_Puzhehei

Cable-stayed bridges in China
Bridges in Guizhou